Lieselotte is a German feminine given name. Diminutive forms of Lieselotte include Liesl, Lotte, and Lilo.

People with the name Lieselotte
 Lieselotte "Lotte" Berk (1913–2003), German dancer and teacher
 Lieselotte Breker (born 1960), German sport shooter
 Lieselotte Feikes (1923–2008), German chemist
 Liselotte Pulver (also known as Lilo Pulver; born 1929), Swiss actress
 Lieselotte "Lilo" Ramdohr (1913–2013), German World War II era member of the White Rose student resistance group
 Lieselotte Templeton (1918–2009), German-American crystallographer
 Lieselotte Thoms-Heinrich (1920–1992), German journalist and feminist
 Lieselotte Van Lindt (born 1989), Belgian field hockey player

Fictional characters
 Lieselotte Achenbach, from the video game series Arcana Heart
 Lieselotte Sherlock, from the anime/manga Trinity Seven
 Lieselotte Riefenstahl, from the anime/light novel Endo and Kobayashi Live! The Latest on Tsundere Villainess Lieselotte

References 

German feminine given names
Feminine given names